Ģirts Feldbergs (born 17 February 1993) is a Latvian swimmer. He competed in the men's 50 metre backstroke event at the 2017 World Aquatics Championships.

At the 2015 Summer Universiade in Gwangju, South Korea, Feldbergs competed in six events: the 50 metre backstroke, 100 metre backstroke, 50 metre freestyle, 100 metre freestyle, 4 × 100 m medley relay and 4 × 100 m freestyle relay.

References

External links
 

1993 births
Living people
Latvian male backstroke swimmers
Place of birth missing (living people)
Latvian male freestyle swimmers
20th-century Latvian people
21st-century Latvian people